Chelliah Rajadurai (born 27 July 1927) is a Sri Lankan Tamil politician and former government minister, Member of Parliament and Mayor of Batticaloa.

Rajadurai was born on 27 July 1927. Rajadurai was a journalist and a member of the editorial staff of the Sutantiran weekly newspaper.

Rajadurai stood as the Illankai Tamil Arasu Kachchi's (Federal Party) candidate for Batticaloa at the 1956 parliamentary election. He won the election and entered Parliament. He was re-elected at the March 1960, July 1960, 1965 and 1970 parliamentary elections. He was the Tamil United Liberation Front candidate in Batticaloa at the 1977 parliamentary election and was re-elected. In March 1979 he defected to the United National Party led government and was rewarded by being appointed Minister of Regional Development and Hindu Cultural Affairs. He was later appointed Sri Lankan High Commissioner in Kuala Lumpur, Malaysia.

Rajadurai became the first Mayor of Batticaloa in 1967. He was unseated the next year.

Rajadurai was still politically active in April 2012. As of June 2021, Rajadurai is retired and lives between Malaysia, India and Sri Lanka.

See also
Sri Lankan Non Career Diplomats

References

1927 births
Living people
Government ministers of Sri Lanka
High Commissioners of Sri Lanka to Malaysia
Illankai Tamil Arasu Kachchi politicians
Mayors of Batticaloa
Members of the 3rd Parliament of Ceylon
Members of the 4th Parliament of Ceylon
Members of the 5th Parliament of Ceylon
Members of the 6th Parliament of Ceylon
Members of the 7th Parliament of Ceylon
Members of the 8th Parliament of Sri Lanka
People from British Ceylon
Sri Lankan diplomats
Tamil people
Sri Lankan Tamil journalists
Sri Lankan Tamil politicians
Tamil United Liberation Front politicians
United National Party politicians
Urban development ministers of Sri Lanka